A hydrofluoric acid burn is a chemical burn from hydrofluoric acid. Where it contacts the skin it results in significant pain, swelling, redness, and skin breakdown. If the fumes are breathed in swelling of the upper airway and bleeding may occur. Complications can include electrolyte, heart, lung, kidney, and neurological problems.

Most exposures occur at work. With concentrations less than 7%, onset of symptoms may not occur for hours while with concentrations greater than 15% onset of symptoms is nearly immediate. Diagnosis should include blood tests for calcium, potassium, and magnesium along with an electrocardiogram.

Initial treatment of exposure involves removing contaminated clothing and washing with large amount of water over at least 30 minutes. Other measures include applying calcium gluconate cream. It is estimated that about a thousand cases occur a year. Most people affected are adult males.

Signs and symptoms

Symptoms of HF exposure include irritation of the eyes, skin, nose, and throat, eye and skin burns, and bone damage.

Complications may occur due to fluoride toxicity. Once absorbed into blood through the skin, it reacts with blood calcium and may cause cardiac arrest. Burns with areas larger than 160 cm2 (25 square inches) have the potential to cause serious systemic toxicity from interference with blood and tissue calcium levels. In some cases, exposures can lead to hypocalcemia.

Breathing in the HF fumes can result in fevers, pulmonary edema (fluid buildup in the lungs), bleeding, and low blood oxygen.

Cause
Hydrogen fluoride is used in a number of industries including glass etching and electronics manufacturing.

It is generated upon combustion of many fluorine-containing compounds such as products containing Viton and polytetrafluoroethylene (Teflon) parts. Hydrofluorocarbons in automatic fire suppression systems can release hydrogen fluoride at high temperatures, and this has led to deaths from acute respiratory failure in military personnel when a rocket-propelled grenade hit the fire suppression system in their vehicle. Hydrofluoric acid can be released from volcanoes, sea salt aerosol, and from welding or manufacturing processes.

Pathophysiology
In the body, hydrofluoric acid reacts with the ubiquitous biologically important ions Ca2+ and Mg2+. Formation of insoluble calcium fluoride is proposed as the cause for both precipitous fall in serum calcium and the severe pain associated with tissue toxicity.

Diagnosis
Diagnosis should include blood tests for calcium, potassium, and magnesium along with an electrocardiogram (ECG). ECG changes may include QRS widening and a prolonged QT interval.

Treatment
Initial treatment of exposure involves removing contaminated clothing and washing the affected area with large amount of water over at least 30 minutes. Calcium gluconate cream is then usually applied. If pain continues calcium gluconate can be injected into the affected area or given by injection into a vein or artery. Surgical removal of the affected tissue may be required.

The calcium gluconate is a source of Ca2+ that sequesters the fluoride ions. Other special rinsing solutions may also be used. An element that has been very useful to avoid the adverse effects of chemical burns and counteract the effect of calcium precipitation is the Hexafluorine solution, which is recommended to implement in laboratory kits, along with first aid items and emergency showers.

Inhaled HF may require oxygen therapy and tracheal intubation. In this situation neutralized calcium gluconate may be used.

In absolutely all cases, it should be treated in an advanced medical manner after first aid has been rendered.

References

Burns
Wikipedia medicine articles ready to translate
Fluorine
Toxic effects of substances chiefly nonmedicinal as to source